Crystal Springs Uplands School is an independent, coeducational, college prep day school in Hillsborough, California, United States. Founded in 1952, the school includes grades 6-12, with approximately 220 students in the middle school and 320 students in the upper school.

In late 2007, The Wall Street Journal identified Crystal Springs Uplands School as one of the world's top 50 schools for its success in preparing students to enter top American universities.

History

Uplands Mansion

The main building of the CSUS campus is the Uplands Mansion, originally built as a private residence by Templeton Crocker, scion of railroad baron Charles F. Crocker. Crocker hired architect Willis Polk to design the home in the style of a neo-classical Renaissance palazzo. Construction of the  home took six years to complete (1911–1917) at a cost of $1.6 million ($ in  dollars).  It featured 39 rooms including 12 bedrooms, and 12 baths. The mansion's interior has European fixtures including handmade marble fireplaces and mantlepieces, all originating from a single 16th-century Italian castle, Italian ironwork, and German woodcarving throughout. A 16th-century hand-carved ceiling from northern Italy graces the ballroom.

Crocker sold the property in 1942. It was intermittently occupied — most notably by Soviet Ambassador Andrei Gromyko and his delegation to the 1951 Japanese Peace conference — until the trustees of the Crystal Springs School For Girls acquired it in 1956.

Middle School Campus
On August 29, 2017, CSUS opened a middle school campus approximately six miles from the upper school campus, at 10 Davis Drive in the city of Belmont. The middle school campus consists of three buildings: a main academic building, a cafe/multipurpose/music building, and a gymnasium.

Athletics

Baseball 
The 2005 and 2006 Crystal Springs Uplands baseball teams won North Coast Section Class B Championships. Following a North Coast Section record 27–3 victory in the 2006 championship game, the San Francisco Chronicle named Crystal Springs Uplands one of the top 20 high school teams in the San Francisco Bay area.

Cross country 
The upper school girls' cross country teams have won seven Section titles (NCS Class 1A-1980, NCS Class A-1984, NCS Division V-2005 & 2006 and CCS Division V-2010, 2011, 2014). The 2005 team finished second at the California State Meet XC meet at Woodward Park.

The 2008 boys' XC team won their first section title  at the Division V level. After two second-place finishes the next two seasons, the boys won CCS Division V titles in 2011, 2012 and 2014. Nick Neely, class of '03, won the NCS individual cross country title in 2002. His winning time of 15:23 on the Hayward HS course remains the fastest time for all Division V runners on that course. He went on to finish second at the state meet behind three-time state winner Tim Nelson. Nick Holterman, class of '15, won the CCS individual cross country title in 2014.

Track and field 
The track and field program returned in 2002 after a two-decade hiatus. The team consisted of one athlete: shot putter Samantha Kuo. After a couple of years and a few additions, the girls' team won the NCS Class A meet in 2004 and 2005. Sam  Kuo became the school's first state meet qualifier in 2005, with a fourth-place finish. That same year, the 400m relay team (Madeleine Evans, Sydney Blankers, Imani McElroy and Caroline Scanlan) qualified for the state meet with their third-place finish. Evans qualified as an individual with a third-place finish in the 400m.

Notable alumni 
Sam Bankman-Fried, suspected fraudster, entrepreneur, investor, former billionaire
Nishad Singh fraudster, co-founder of FTX
Polly Draper, actress, writer, producer; known for her role as Ellyn Warren in thirtysomething
Jon Fisher, co-founder and chief executive officer of Bharosa, an Oracle company that produces the Oracle Adaptive Access Manager
Will Harvey, Silicon Valley entrepreneur who achieved early fame as an Apple II game programmer at the age of 15 and created the game IMVU
Patty Hearst, heiress famously kidnapped by the Symbionese Liberation Army in 1974
Jack Herrick (Class of 1987), founder of wikiHow
Charlie Kubal, music producer, created 2010's Mashup Album of the Year, the notorious xx
Tyson Mao, competitive Rubik's Cube solver and co-founder of the World Cube Association; contestant on season two of the reality show Beauty and the Geek
Kitty Margolis, jazz singer known for the album Heart and Soul: Live in San Francisco
Daniel Naroditsky, chess grandmaster; author of Mastering Positional Chess: Practical Lessons of a Junior World Champion and Mastering Complex Endgames: Practical Lessons on Critical Ideas & Plans
Veronica Perez, soccer player, striker for Mexico women's national football team
Josh Tenenbaum, MIT professor and researcher in cognitive science and AI

References

External links

Official website

Educational institutions established in 1952
High schools in San Mateo County, California
Private high schools in California
Private middle schools in California
1952 establishments in California